Thomas Peter Ellison Curry Q.C. (22 July 1921 – 25 January 2010) was a prominent English Barrister and athlete.  The only man to take silk twice, he won triple Blues at Oxford and represented Great Britain in the 1948 Olympic Games.

Personal life 

Thomas Peter Ellison Curry was born in Muree, India, where his father was stationed with the Royal Artillery.  He was educated at Tonbridge and Oriel College, Oxford.  At Oxford, he read law and graduated with a first, winning Middle Temple's Harmsworth Scholarship.

He married Pamela Joyce Curry (née Holmes) in 1951 and had four children. He lived most of his married life in Surrey, latterly in the village of Dunsfold near Godalming. Their daughter Jilly was a freestyle skier, who won 29 29 FIS World Cup medals, and competed in a demonstration event at the 1992 Winter Olympics.

Military service
Curry was commissioned into the Royal Artillery from cadet on the 19th October 1941 and served in Burma and India during the Second World War in the 17th Indian Division.  He fought at the Battle of Kohima (1944) and left India as a Second Lieutenant, returning to serve in the War Office.

Athletics 

Curry was a good sportsman awarded Blues in squash, athletics, and cross-country.  He won the 1947 Varsity Race and represented Great Britain in the 1947 World Student Games in Paris, where he finished fourth in the three-mile-race.  He won the 3000 metres steeplechase in the 1948 AAA Championships and was selected for that event at the 1948 Olympics in London, but did not make the final.  He considered his best distance to be the mile and beat Roger Bannister twice over that distance, first in the 1946 Oxford University Freshmen Sports and subsequently when Bannister was running for Oxford University at a race in St Leonards-on-Sea, West Sussex. However, Curry did not run or train with Bannister during the build-up to the four-minute mile (which happened in 1954).

Legal career 

Curry was called by Middle Temple in 1953 and took silk for the first time in 1966.  A year later, he left the bar and joined Freshfields as a solicitor, where he set up the tax department.  Returning to the bar in 1970, he took silk for a second time in 1974.  In 1979 he became head of chambers at 4 Stone Buildings, a position in which he remained until his retirement in 1996.

Curry appeared in many reported cases.  He acted for John Lennon, George Harrison, and Ringo Starr in their dispute with Paul McCartney, the shareholders in Banco Ambrosiano, following the bank's collapse in the 1980s, and for Thomas Ward, the former director involved in the Guinness share-trading scandal.

References

1921 births
2010 deaths
People educated at Tonbridge School
Alumni of Oriel College, Oxford
Members of the Middle Temple
People from Murree
English barristers
English male long-distance runners
British male steeplechase runners
English male steeplechase runners
Olympic athletes of Great Britain
Athletes (track and field) at the 1948 Summer Olympics
English King's Counsel
20th-century King's Counsel
20th-century English lawyers
British Army personnel of World War II
Royal Artillery officers
Indian Army personnel of World War II
British Indian Army officers
War Office personnel in World War II
Military personnel of British India